Khadija Abdalla Bajaber is a Mombasa-born poet and novelist with a degree in journalism whose manuscript was selected as the first winner of the Graywolf Press Africa Prize, awarded for a first novel manuscript by an African author primarily residing in Africa.

Life and career
A Kenyan of Hadrami descent, Bajaber writes about the ill-documented history of the Hadrami diaspora. Her work has been published in Lolwe, Brainstorm Kenya and Enkare Review, and she is the assistant fiction editor for the Panorama: The Journal of Intelligent Travel. She lives in Mombasa, Kenya.

Bajaber's manuscript, titled 'The House of Rust', was chosen from nearly 200 submissions by judge A. Igoni Barrett, author of the acclaimed novel Blackass, in conjunction with the Graywolf editors. Bajaber, who lives in Mombasa, Kenya, will receive a $12,000 advance. In addition, 66th&2nd will publish The House of Rust in Italy, a partnership that will continue with the Graywolf Press Africa Prize going forward.

Planned for publication in 2020, The House of Rust is the story of a young Mombasa-born girl who goes to the sea to search for her fisherman father, accompanied by a scholar's cat. Bajaber blends the folk stories of post-independence Mombasa with a coming-of-age tale, as her protagonist faces the monsters ahead and the demons of her past. Bajaber's magical realist debut explores selfishness and independence, family loyalty and individuality.

A. Igoni Barrett, the judge of the Graywolf Africa Press Prize. said: "The House of Rust is an exhilarating journey into the imagination of an author for whom the fantastic is not only written about, it is performed on the page. Khadija Abdalla Bajaber has infused new life into the age-old story of adventure on the high seas—with this heroic first novel she has struck deep into that mythic realm explored by everyone from Homer to Hemingway."

"On the surface this is a limpid tale—a straightforward quest story—of a young Mombasa-born girl seeking her missing fisherman father, but it is eddied and enriched by what lurks beneath the surface of both the sea and the prose. Everything in this story sparkles: the fierceness of the narrative voice, the unimpeachable dramatic timing, the sumptuous imagery, the insightful characterization, the spirited wordplay, the honed wisdom of the dialogue, the bold imagination. Everywhere in this story is evidence of a mind that understands that we read not only to see other worlds or lives, but to feel them."

In October 2022, The House of Rust won the inaugural Ursula K. Le Guin Prize for Fiction. The jury for the award "praised Bajaber’s transcendent writing and innovative, transporting story, saying: 'Scene after scene is gleaming, textured, utterly devoid of cliché and arresting in its wisdom. The novel's structure is audacious and its use of language is to die for.'"

References

External links
, Graywolf Press News

Living people
People from Mombasa
Kenyan women novelists
21st-century Kenyan writers
21st-century Kenyan women writers
Year of birth missing (living people)